Justis–Jones House, also known as the Henry S. McComb House, is a historic home located near Wilmington, New Castle County, Delaware. The original section was built about 1840, and is a two-story, two-bay, nearly square gable-roofed fieldstone dwelling in a vernacular Greek Revival style. A frame rear wing constructed in two phases between 1904 and 1924.  Also on the property is a contributing frame garage dating to about 1920.

It was added to the National Register of Historic Places in 1998.

References

Houses on the National Register of Historic Places in Delaware
Greek Revival houses in Delaware
Houses completed in 1840
Houses in Wilmington, Delaware
National Register of Historic Places in Wilmington, Delaware